Sanatorium Under the Sign of the Hourglass is an album by the Cracow Klezmer Band performing compositions written by John Zorn in tribute to the Polish writer Bruno Schultz.

Track listing
 "Meshakh" – 4:55
 "Galgalim" – 5:14
 "Tirzah" – 10:40
 "Yesod" – 4:45
 "Pagiel" – 7:34
 "Adithaim" – 6:45
 "Hamadah" – 6:17
 "Regalim" – 4:45
 "Demai" – 9:08
 "Meholalot" – 5:39

All compositions by John Zorn.

Personnel
Jaroslaw Bester – bayan
Oleg Dyyak – bayan, clarinet, percussion
Wojciech Front – double bass
Jaroslaw Tyrala – violin
Grazyna Auguscik – vocals

References

2005 albums
Albums produced by John Zorn
Tzadik Records albums
The Cracow Klezmer Band albums
Adaptations of works by Bruno Schulz